The 1986–87 season was Arsenal's 68th consecutive season in the top flight of English football.

Season summary
This season saw the return of their former player George Graham as manager. Graham had been appointed just after the end of the previous season as successor to Don Howe who had resigned in late March. He had been a member of Arsenal's double winning team in 1971, but Arsenal had gone since 1979 without winning a major trophy, finishing seventh in the two seasons leading up to Graham's arrival and finishing as low as 10th in 1983.

On 9 June 1986 Graham’s first transfer activity was to sell Martin Keown to Aston Villa for £125,000, after refusing him an extra £50 a week, and giving a young Tony Adams the chance to establish himself in the side.
Perry Groves was signed from Colchester on 4 September for £75,000. He made his debut as a sub one week later against Luton Town. 

Arsenal started the season well and were top of the league from mid-November to late January. Arsenal showed qualities of teamwork based on a traditional solidity in defence which might have prolonged their challenge but for injuries to key players, most notably Paul Davis, and a 10-match winless run went against their title hopes in the second half of the season, and they eventually finished fourth, with Everton finishing champions for the second time in three seasons. Though Arsenal finished fourth in Graham’s first season in charge, Arsenal did win the Football League Cup, in a campaign marked by comebacks. Arsenal faced Tottenham Hotspur in the semi-finals; after losing 1–0 at Highbury in the first leg and conceding a second goal in the first half of the second leg at White Hart Lane, Arsenal scored twice through Viv Anderson and Niall Quinn to draw 2–2 on aggregate and force a replay; in the replay Spurs went 1–0 up, only for Arsenal to come back again with late goals from Ian Allinson and David Rocastle to win. The Wembley final against Liverpool was a repeat performance; after Arsenal had gone 1–0 down to an Ian Rush goal, two Charlie Nicholas goals brought Arsenal their first League Cup triumph and their first major trophy for eight years. However, UEFA voted to continue the ban on English clubs in European competitions that was imposed in the wake of the Heysel disaster in 1985 for a third season, and this meant that Arsenal were unable to compete in the 1987–88 UEFA-Cup.   

Tony Adams, the 20-year-old centre-half who played in every single game for Arsenal this season, was voted PFA Young Player of the Year. Striker Niall Quinn and wingers David Rocastle and Martin Hayes both became regular members of the first team this season, with Hayes finishing as Arsenal's top scorer with 24 goals in all competitions.

Squad

Results

First Division

Football League Cup

FA Cup

Arsenal entered the FA Cup in the third round proper, in which they were drawn to face Reading.

Top scorers

First Division
  Martin Hayes 19 (8 penalties)
  Niall Quinn 8
  Tony Adams 6
  Viv Anderson 4
  Charlie Nicholas 4
  Paul Davis 4

References

External links
 Arsenal 1986–87 on statto.com

Arsenal
Arsenal F.C. seasons